Wilford Rex Black (January 31, 1920 – December 12, 2012) was an American politician.

Biography
Wilford Rex Black represented the 2nd Utah Senate District from 1973 to 1997. W. Rex Black, as he was often referred to, was a member of the Democratic party and represented the party as the Minority leader in the Utah Senate for many years.

Notes

1920 births
2012 deaths
Democratic Party Utah state senators